The 1974–75 FIBA European Cup Winners' Cup was the ninth edition of FIBA's 2nd-tier level European-wide professional club basketball competition, contested between national domestic cup champions, running from 6 November 1974, to 26 March 1975. It was contested by 22 teams, three less than in the previous edition.

Spartak Leningrad defeated Crvena zvezda, the former FIBA European Cup Winner's Cup champion, in the final, held in Nantes, and became the first and only Soviet League team to win the competition for the second time.

Participants

First round

|}

Second round

|}

Automatically qualified to the Quarter finals group stage
 Crvena zvezda (title holder)
 Spartak Leningrad

Quarterfinals
The quarter finals were played with a round-robin system, in which every Two Game series (TGS) constituted as one game for the record.

Semifinals

|}

Final
March 26, Palais des Sports de Beaulieu, Nantes

|}

References

External links 
FIBA European Cup Winner's Cup 1974–75 linguasport.com
FIBA European Cup Winner's Cup 1974–75

Cup
FIBA Saporta Cup